The following is a summary of Donegal county football team's 2020 season. The season was suspended in March 2020 due to the COVID-19 pandemic. The season resumed in mid-October of the same year.

Jason McGee had hip surgery in Coventry, England, on 28 November 2019, causing him to miss the opening part of the season.

Odhrán Mac Niallais did not return, having previously opted out of the 2019 season.

Eamonn Doherty, Hugh McFadden and Odhrán McFadden-Ferry were all struck down by "January flu" as the season opened. Eight players completed the league and championship season while awaiting the outcome of the 2020 Donegal Senior Football Championship final (postponed following a case of COVID-19 at the Kilcar club); these were Patrick McBrearty, Ryan McHugh, Eoin McHugh and Andrew McClean, as well as the following from their opponents Naomh Conaill: Ciarán Thompson, Jeaic Mac Ceallbhuí, Eoghan McGettigan and Ethan O'Donnell.

Squad
  S. Patton
  E. B. Gallagher
  N. McGee
  E. McHugh
  R. McHugh
  P. Brennan
  P. Morgan
  H. McFadden
  C. McGonagle
  B. McCole
  N. O'Donnell
  M. Langan
  P. McBrearty
  M. Murphy (c.)
  J. Brennan

  A. McClean for P. Brennan
  D. Ó Baoill for E. McHugh
  C. Thompson for McBrearty
  J. McGee for O'Donnell

  M. Lynch
  J. McKelvey
  E. McGettigan
  C. Ward
  E. Doherty
  C. O'Donnell
  P. McGrath

  S. McMenamin
  M. Carroll
  C. Diver
  K. Gillespie
  A. Doherty

 D. Bonner

 P. McGonigle
 
 S. Rochford

Others
 Conor Morrison
 Ethan O'Donnell

Personnel changes
Players added to the panel included Ethan O'Donnell, Jeaic MacCeallbhui, Andrew McClean, Conor O'Donnell, Ciaran Diver, Enda McCormick, Aaron Deeney (St Eunan's) and Brian O'Donnell.

Cian Mulligan joined the panel again after departing the previous season. Conor Morrison, who played six games in the 2019 season before deciding to depart in March, returned.

Michael Carroll was recalled after his midfield performances in the 2019 Donegal SFC. Tony McClenaghan also returned, following his injury.

Frank McGlynn retired ahead of the 2020 season.

Competitions

Dr McKenna Cup

National Football League Division 1

Donegal competed in Division 1 for the 2020 National League season. The GAA published the fixture schedule on 26 November 2019. On 12 March 2020, the GAA suspended the National League in mid-March due to the COVID-19 pandemic. Games resumed in October 2020. The footballers travelled the round-trip of 900 kilometres to Tralee in their own cars to play Kerry in the first game, a feat described in the Irish Independent as the "most eye-catching example of GAA expeditions in the Covid era".

Table

Reports

Ulster Senior Football Championship

The draw for the 2020 Ulster SFC took place on RTÉ Radio 1 on the morning of 9 October 2019.

Paddy McGrath sustained an injury during training ahead of the 2020 Ulster SFC semi-final, which ruled him out.

Ciarán Thompson and Oisín Gallen sustained injuries during training ahead of the 2020 Ulster SFC final; Thompson could only make a substitute appearance in the game and Gallen could not play at all.

Bracket

Reports

All-Ireland Senior Football Championship

Due to the impact of the COVID-19 pandemic on Gaelic games, the GAA announced that there would be no back-door route into the All-Ireland Championship. Therefore, because Donegal did not win the Ulster Championship, they did not qualify for the 2020 All-Ireland Championship.

Management team
Confirmed in November 2017, with replacements noted:
Manager: Declan Bonner
Assistant manager: Paul McGonigle, not listed among November 2017 appointments
Head coach: John McElholm
Coach: Gary Boyle
Selector: Stephen Rochford, replacing Karl Lacey after 2018 season but Lacey actually carried on until the end of 2020
Goalkeeping coach: Andrew McGovern
Strength and conditioning coach: Paul Fisher
Nutritionist: Ronan Doherty
Team physician: Kevin Moran
Physio: Cathal Ellis
Psychology and performance manager: Anthony McGrath, previously involved with the minor team
Video analysis: Chris Byrne
Logistics: Packie McDyre
Kitman: Barry McBride

Awards

All Stars
Three nominations, for P. Morgan, M. Lanagan and Ciarán Thompson.

Notes

References

External links
 Matchday programmes released online for games played during the COVID-19 pandemic:
 NFL Round 6 v Tyrone 
 NFL Round 7 v Kerry 
 Ulster quarter-final v Tyrone 
 Ulster semi-final v Armagh 
 Ulster final 

Donegal
Donegal county football team seasons